Ari-Pekka Nurmenkari (born 8 July 1983) is a Finnish former competitive figure skater. He is a seven-time (2003–2007, 2009, 2010) Finnish national champion and has represented Finland at the World Figure Skating Championships. He is the 2008 & 2009 Nordic champion.

Nurmenkari withdrew from the 2012 European Championships due to an ankle injury.

Personal life 
Nurmenkari married former professional tennis player, Annina Ahti, on 9 August 2008. They have a son, Axel, who was born in August 2009.

Programs

Competitive highlights 
GP: Grand Prix; JGP: Junior Grand Prix

References

External links 

 
 Ari-Pekka Nurmenkari at Sportfolio

Navigation

Living people
1983 births
Sportspeople from Helsinki
Finnish male single skaters
Figure skaters at the 2010 Winter Olympics
Olympic figure skaters of Finland